The Roman Catholic Diocese of Bunbury is a suffragan Latin Rite diocese of the Archdiocese of Perth, established in 1954, covering the South West and Great Southern regions of Western Australia.

Ordinaries
The following individuals have been elected as Roman Catholic Bishop of Bunbury:
{| class="wikitable"
!Order
!Name
!Date enthroned
!Reign ended
!Term of office
!Reason for term end
|-
|align="center"| ||Lancelot Goody † ||align="center"|12 November 1954 ||align="center"|18 October 1968 ||align="right"| ||Elevated as Archbishop of Perth
|-
|align="center"| ||Myles McKeon † ||align="center"|6 March 1969 ||align="center"|18 February 1982 ||align="right"| ||Resigned and appointed Bishop Emeritus of Bunbury
|-
|align="center"| ||Peter Quinn † ||align="center"|26 May 1982 ||align="center"|20 December 2000 ||align="right"| ||Resigned and appointed Bishop Emeritus of Bunbury
|-
|align="center"| ||Gerard Joseph Holohan ||align="center"| 5 September 2001 ||align="center"|present ||align="right"| || n/a
|-
|}

Parishes
The diocese is divided into three separate deaneries that administer individual parishes:
Great Southern deanery with regular liturgical services held in the parishes of Albany (St Joseph), Denmark (St Mary), Esperance (Star of the Sea), Katanning (St Patrick), Kojonup (St Bernard), Lake Grace (Maria Regina), Mount Barker (Sacred Heart), Narrogin (St Matthew), and Wagin (St Joseph)
Lower South West deanery with regular liturgical services held in the parishes of Boyup Brook (St Mary), Bridgetown (St Brigid), Busselton (St Joseph and Our Lady of the Bay), Donnybrook (St Mary), Dunsborough (Our Lady of the Southern Cross), Manjimup (St Joseph), Margaret River (St Thomas More), and Pemberton (Sacred Heart)
South West deanery with regular liturgical services held in the parishes of Bunbury (Cathedral Parish of St Patrick), Brunswick Junction (Our Lady's Assumption), Collie (St Brigid), Dardanup (The Immaculate Conception), Dawesville (St Damien), Harvey (Our Lady of Immaculate Conception), Australind (Church of the Living Vine), Mandurah (Our Lady's Assumption), Pinjarra (St Augustine), and Waroona (St Patrick)

Controversy

In 2003 Adrian Richard Van Klooster, a Catholic priest, pleaded guilty to four counts of indecently dealing with children under the age of 13 and was found with child pornography on his computer.

See also

 Roman Catholicism in Australia

References

External links
Catholic Diocese of Bunbury

 
Bunbury
Bunbury, Roman Catholic Diocese of
Bunbury, Western Australia
Bunbury
Bunbury
Bunbury